Brumbach or Brumback may refer to:

Brumbach (Wipper), a river of Saxony-Anhalt, Germany, tributary of the Wipper

People with that surname
Babette Brumback, American biostatistician
Charles T. Brumback, American newspaper publisher, president of the Orlando Sentinel in the late 1970s
Clarence L. Brumback (died 2012), American public health director, 1989 winner of Sedgwick Memorial Medal
Lieutenant Colonel Jefferson Brumback, commander of the 95th Ohio Infantry in the American Civil War
John Sanford Brumback (1829–1897), American businessman, namesake of Brumback Library in Ohio
Katie Sandwina, (1884–1952) (birth name Brumbach), a circus strongwoman
Lexi Brumback (born 2000), American cheerleader and television personality
Louise Upton Brumback (1867–1929), American artist and art activist known for her landscapes and marine scenes, her surname from time to time misspelled as Brumbach
Helga and Sylvia Brumbach, target girls
Roger Alan Brumback (1948–2013), American neurologist, namesake of Brumback's night monkey

See also
Brumbaugh